In Semitic linguistics, an emphatic consonant is an obstruent consonant which originally contrasted with series of both voiced and voiceless obstruents.  In specific Semitic languages, the members of this series may be realized as uvularized or pharyngealized, velarized, ejective, or plain voiced or voiceless consonants. It is also used, to a lesser extent, to describe cognate series in other Afro-Asiatic languages, where they are typically realized as ejective, implosive, or pharyngealized consonants.

In Semitic studies, they are commonly transcribed using the convention of placing a dot under the closest plain obstruent consonant in the Latin alphabet. With respect to particular Semitic and Afro-Asiatic languages, this term describes the particular phonetic feature which distinguishes these consonants from other consonants. Thus, in Arabic emphasis is synonymous with a secondary articulation involving retraction of the dorsum or root of the tongue, which has variously been described as velarization or pharyngealization depending on where the locus of the retraction is assumed to be. Original emphatic k developed into  in most Semitic languages; strictly speaking, it has thus ceased to be an emphatic version of k and has become a completely different consonant. (Accordingly, another common transcription in Semitic languages is q).

Within Arabic, the emphatic consonants vary in phonetic realization from dialect to dialect, but are typically realized as pharyngealized consonants. In Ethiopian Semitic and Modern South Arabian languages, they are realized as ejective consonants.  While these sounds do not necessarily share any particular phonetic properties in common, most historically derive from a common source.

Five such "emphatic" phonemes are reconstructed for Proto-Semitic:  

General Israeli Modern Hebrew and Maltese are notable exceptions among Semitic languages to the presence of emphatic consonants. In both languages, they have been lost under the influence of Indo-European languages (particularly Yiddish in the case of Hebrew and Sicilian in the case of Maltese, though other languages may also have had an influence).

 In Hebrew, the letter tsadi (from Proto-Semitic ,) remains distinct as an affricate , but without pharyngealization. Emphatic  has been merged with plain k in some positions, but remains distinct post-vocally, where the plain consonant becomes , while the original emphatic does not. Semitic  has been fully merged with plain t.
 In Maltese, only emphatic  (= q) remains distinct. It is still realised as a uvular stop  in a few villages but has otherwise developed into a glottal stop. All other emphatics have been merged into plain consonants. However, they are sometimes still recognizable from special vocalic developments that they triggered before the mergers. Compare sejf ("sword") with sajf ("summer"), in which the latter originally had an emphatic ṣ that prevented the a from becoming e (as it did in the former word with a plain s).

Notes

References 

Phonology
Phonetics
Semitic linguistics